Douglas J. Eboch (born December 10, 1967) is an American screenwriter, author and educator, best known for the 2002 comedy Sweet Home Alabama, starring Reese Witherspoon, Josh Lucas, Patrick Dempsey and Candice Bergen.

His sister, Chris Eboch, is a children's author.

Early life
Born in Chicago, Eboch would migrate to Saudi Arabia and later Alaska. He is a 1986 graduate of Juneau-Douglas High School in Juneau, Alaska; while attending JDHS he was very active in the drama department, appearing in plays such as Helen Keller.

Career
His screenwriting career took off when he wrote the original story for the 2002 film Sweet Home Alabama as his Masters thesis at the University of Southern California film school. The final film would be written by C. Jay Cox, and would gross $128 million domestically. Since then, he has worked as a script doctor, but has directed several short films. He was awarded the Carl Sautter Award as Best New Voice, Features.

Outside of film, he also wrote the children's Christmas play Sleepover at the Stable..., as well as the video game Night Cove. He teaches at several schools and institutions such as USC and Art Center College of Design. In 2016, he published a screenwriting manual, The Three Stages of Screenwriting, which is broken up into three distinct phases: outlining, first draft and rewriting. He also wrote The Hollywood Pitching Bible, a guide on how to pitch a film project, with Ken Aguado.

References

External links
 Official Website
 Official Blog

1967 births
Living people
American male screenwriters
USC School of Cinematic Arts alumni
Screenwriting instructors
Writers of books about writing fiction
American male non-fiction writers
Writers from Chicago
Screenwriters from Illinois
Screenwriters from Alaska
21st-century American screenwriters
21st-century American non-fiction writers
21st-century American male writers
University of Southern California faculty
Art Center College of Design faculty